WAYS may refer to:

Acronyms
 Waverley Action for Youth Services, a non-profit in Sydney, Australia
 World Association of Young Scientists, formerly World Academy of Young Scientists

United States mass media
 WAYS (AM), a radio station (1050 AM) currently licensed to Conway, South Carolina, United States
 WAYS (1500 AM), a defunct radio station (1500 AM) formerly licensed to Macon, Georgia, United States
 WFNZ (AM),  a radio station (610 AM) licensed to Charlotte, North Carolina, United States, which held the call sign WAYS from 1941 to 1984
 WAYS-TV, a UHF television station (channel 36) licensed to Charlotte, North Carolina, United States from 1954 to 1955; see WCCB

Other
 An alternative name for a slipway